Eleocharis papillosa is a sedge of the family Cyperaceae that is native to Australia.

The annual herb produces brown flowers in November.

It has a scattered population that is found in and around open clay flats and clay pans in the Mid West, Gascoyne, Pilbara and Goldfields-Esperance regions of Western Australia and grows in red clay soils over granite.

References

Plants described in 1979
Flora of Western Australia
papillosa